Galium geminiflorum, the twinflowered bedstraw,  is a plant species in the Rubiaceae, currently accepted as a distinct species. This 1838 name by Lowe should not be confused with the 1844 plant given the same name by Martens & Galeotti.

Galium geminiflorum Lowe is native to certain islands of the eastern North Atlantic: Madeira, the Canary Islands and Selvagens (Savage Islands)

References

geminiflorum
Endemic flora of Macaronesia
Plants described in 1838